Judy Bramley (died 2022 ) was an American bridge player. She won three National titles playing as Judy Wadas. Judy was married to Bart Bramley.

Bridge accomplishments

Wins

 North American Bridge Championships (3)
 Machlin Women's Swiss Teams (2) 1997, 2000 
 Wagar Women's Knockout Teams (1) 1996

Runners-up

 North American Bridge Championships (3)
 Machlin Women's Swiss Teams (1) 1988 
 Sternberg Women's Board-a-Match Teams (1) 2000 
 Rockwell Mixed Pairs (1) 1981

Notes

External links

American contract bridge players